Kyle Turner (born 10 November 1997) is a Scottish footballer who plays as a midfielder for Partick Thistle. Turner began his career with Stranraer, where he made 138 appearances over a four-year period, and has also played for Dunfermline Athletic, as well as Airdrieonians on loan.

Club career

Stranraer
Turner began his career playing with St Mirren and Partick Thistle youth teams, before signing with Scottish League One side Stranraer in 2015. His first appearance for the Stair Park club came as a final-minute substitution against Stenhousemuir on 12 September 2015, with his first full start coming a week later against Albion Rovers.

Dunfermline Athletic
Turner spent four years with Stranraer, before signing a two-year contract with Scottish Championship side Dunfermline Athletic on 28 May 2019. In March 2021, Turner moved on loan to Scottish League One club Airdrieonians until the end of the season. Turner left Dunfermline following the end of his contract in May 2021.

Partick Thistle
Turner signed for Partick Thistle, who he previously played with as a youth player.

Turner scored his first goal for Thistle, scoring a 96th minute winner in a 1-0 home win against Raith Rovers.

Personal life
Turner is the son of former Morton, St Johnstone and St Mirren midfielder Tommy Turner.

Career statistics

References

External links

1997 births
Living people
Scottish footballers
Footballers from Paisley, Renfrewshire
Association football midfielders
Stranraer F.C. players
Dunfermline Athletic F.C. players
Airdrieonians F.C. players
Partick Thistle F.C. players
Scottish Professional Football League players